The men's BMX racing competition at the 2012 Olympic Games in London took place at the BMX track at the Velopark within the Olympic Park, from 8 to 10 August.

Latvia's Māris Štrombergs won the gold medal, successfully defending his victory in 2008, with a time of 37.576 seconds. Sam Willoughby, representing Australia, won silver and Carlos Oquendo from Colombia took the bronze.

Competition format 

The riders were seeded into four quarter-finals based on a time trial. Each of the four quarter-finals comprised five runs, using a point-for-place system. The top two riders after three runs advanced to the semi-finals (without having to finish the remaining two rides), in addition the top two remaining riders progressed after the full five runs. The semi-finals consisted of three runs, with the top four in each group advancing to the final. The final was a one-run contest.

Schedule 
All times are British Summer Time (UTC+1)

Results

Seeding run

Quarter-finals

Heat 1

Heat 2

Heat 3

Heat 4

Semi-finals

Semi-final 1

Semi-final 2

Final

References

Cycling at the 2012 Summer Olympics
BMX at the Summer Olympics
2012 in BMX
Men's events at the 2012 Summer Olympics